Myoxanthus reymondii is a species of orchid occurring from western Venezuela to Ecuador.

References

External links 

reymondii
Orchids of Ecuador
Orchids of Venezuela